Rémo Meyer (born 12 November 1980) is a Swiss former professional footballer who played as a right-back.

International career
He has five caps for the Switzerland national football team.

References

External links
 

Living people
1980 births
People from Langenthal
People from Oberaargau District
Sportspeople from the canton of Bern
Swiss men's footballers
Association football fullbacks
Switzerland international footballers
Switzerland under-21 international footballers
Swiss Super League players
Bundesliga players
2. Bundesliga players
Austrian Football Bundesliga players
FC Luzern players
FC Lausanne-Sport players
TSV 1860 Munich players
FC Red Bull Salzburg players
Swiss expatriate footballers
Swiss expatriate sportspeople in Germany
Expatriate footballers in Germany